Robot × LaserBeam (stylized as ROBOT×LASERBEAM)  is a Japanese sports manga series written and illustrated by Tadatoshi Fujimaki. It tells the story of an eccentric high school student nicknamed "Robot" who encounters golf for the first time. It was serialized in Shueisha's Weekly Shōnen Jump from March 2017 to June 2018, with its chapters collected in seven tankōbon volumes. In North America, it has been licensed by Viz Media, which published it on their digital Weekly Shonen Jump magazine and published the seven volumes digitally in September 2020.

Characters

A talented golfer with no interest in the game until "winning" a game against Youzan. His shots are considered by friends and opponents to be like Lasers. He is brutally honest and often has a blank expression on his face. His orange hair comes from his mom, who is Scottish.

Robota's Rival. A former Kendo player. He loves golf, and is always looking for a challenge. When he swings his clubs, they are considered to be similar to Iai slashes.

Publication
Robot × LaserBeam is written and illustrated by Tadatoshi Fujimaki. The series ran in Shueisha's Weekly Shōnen Jump from March 18, 2017, to June 25, 2018. Shueisha collected its chapters into seven tankōbon volumes, released from July 4, 2017, to September 4, 2018.

In North America, Viz Media published the series on their digital Weekly Shonen Jump magazine. Viz Media announced the English digital release of the manga in November 2019. The seven volumes were published on September 22, 2020.

Volume list

Reception
The manga had 460,000 copies in circulation as of December 2017. As of May 2018, the manga had 700,000 copies in circulation.

References

External links
 

Golf in anime and manga
Shueisha manga
Shōnen manga
Viz Media manga